State Route 361 (SR 361) is an 8.8 mile long east-west state highway in Carter County, Tennessee. It serves as a connector between Pine Crest and Hampton, as well as provides access to the Laurels Recreation Area section of the Cherokee National Forest.

Portions of the highway are known as Laurels Road, Dry Creek Road, and Gap Creek Road.

Route description

SR 361 begins as Laurels Road in southern Pine Crest at an intersection with SR 359. It heads southeast through farmland and rural areas before passing through mountains, a narrow section of the Cherokee National Forest, and by the Laurels Recreation Area. The highway then becomes Dry Creek Road and goes east along a narrow valley to have an intersection with SR 362. SR 361 then becomes Gap Creek Road and continues east through rural areas to enter Hampton and crosses a bridge over the Little Doe River. The highway then comes to an end at an intersection with US 19E/SR 37 south of downtown. The entire route of SR 361 is a two-lane highway.

Major intersections

References

361
Transportation in Carter County, Tennessee
Hampton, Tennessee